Kurt Deketelaere (born 29 July 1966 in Torhout) is a Belgian academic and president of the League of European Research Universities (LERU). He is a professor of law in environmental law at the KU Leuven.

External links
Official website Kurt Deketelaere
Official website LERU

1966 births
Living people
Place of birth missing (living people)
Academic staff of KU Leuven
People from Torhout